Bailando por un Sueño is an Argentinian reality television show in which celebrity contestants and professional dance partners compete to be the best dancers, as determined by the show's judges and public voting. The series first broadcast was in 2006, and seven complete seasons have aired on El Trece. During each season, competitors are progressively eliminated on the basis of public voting and scores received from the judges until only a few contestants remain. These finalists participate in a semi-finale and a finale, from which a winner is determined. Celebrities appearing on Bailando por un Sueño include "actors, comedians, musicians, entrepreneurs, reality stars and vedettes".

As of season 7, 176 celebrities have competed, three of whom withdrew from the competition. A total of 125 professional dancers have partnered with the celebrities, and those who participated in the most seasons include Pier Fritzsche, Maximiliano D'Iorio, Gabriel Usandivaras and Juan Pablo Battaglia with four seasons each. The six winners of the show, in chronological order, are Carmen Barbieri, Florencia de la V, Carla Conte, Celina Rucci, Carolina "Pampita" Ardohain, Fabio "La Mole" Moli and Noelia Pompa & Hernán Piquín, the first couple composed by celebrities to win the competition. Professional partners who have won are Christian Ponce, Manuel Rodríguez, Guillermo Comforte, Matías Sayago, Nicolás Armengol and Mariana Conci.

Competitors
In the following list, participants are shown in the inverse order of their finish in each season.

 – Celebrity Winner
 – Celebrity Runner-up
 – Celebrity Semi-finalist
 – Celebrity that withdrew 
 – Celebrity disqualified
 – Celebrity that was eliminated and got the opportunity to come back
 – In the competition 

Competitors
Argentine variety television shows